Brynn Cartelli (born April 16, 2003) is an American pop singer. She is the winner of season 14 of the American talent competition The Voice. At the age of 15, she became the youngest person in the show's history to win the competition. She won a recording contract from Republic Records and a brand new Tacoma.

Early life

Cartelli was born  in Longmeadow, Massachusetts. She began playing piano when she was five and it was her parents who introduced her to classical, country and soul music. In middle school she started taking voice lessons and took up the guitar.

In the summer of 2016, Cartelli was performing at a restaurant on Jetties Beach in Nantucket with a local islander when a bartender posted a video of her playing to Facebook. The clip eventually received tens of thousands of views, including from the producers with The Voice. They contacted her and asked if she would come to New York for a private audition. She flew to Los Angeles after getting through the first cut to audition in front of the show's producers. She beat out over a hundred other contestants to earn a blind audition in front of the four celebrity judges, but wasn't picked for that season's show. The producers called her back a week later and said they wanted her to try out for the following season. It was during this audition that she turned two chairs and wound up choosing Kelly Clarkson as her coach for the rest of the season. When she was young she sang at a restaurant in Vermont where she met many supporting people who believed in her from the age of 8.

Career

The Voice (2018)

Cartelli auditioned in 2018 to compete in the fourteenth season of The Voice. For her blind audition, she sang "Beneath Your Beautiful" by Labrinth and Emeli Sandé. Two of the four coaches, Kelly Clarkson and Blake Shelton, turned their chairs for her. She chose to be part of Team Kelly, who was a first-time coach on the show.

Over the course of the competition, Cartelli continued to showcase her vocal ability. It was often noted that the coaches believed that her voice was powerful and mature despite her young age. She competed against twenty-one-year-old Dylan Hartigan in the Battle rounds as the two sang "...Ready for It?" by Taylor Swift. Clarkson deemed her the winner and advanced her to the Knockout rounds (while her opponent, Hartigan, was stolen to Team Blake).  In the Knockout rounds, she then defeated fellow team member Jamella with her rendition of "Here Comes Goodbye" by Rascal Flatts, which Clarkson deemed superior to Jamella's performance of "Girl Crush" by Little Big Town.  Thus, Cartelli advanced to the live shows.

On the first night of the Live Playoffs, Cartelli performed the song "Unstoppable" by Sia. The public voted her straight through to the top twelve, sparing her a second performance that week. Coincidentally, Cartelli's performance was on her fifteenth birthday.  Kaleb Lee would end up joining her in the top twelve via the public vote on Team Kelly's second performance night, and D.R. King would be Clarkson's final save choice to join them both.

Cartelli continued advancing throughout the live shows. Her performances included covers of "Up to the Mountain" by Patty Griffin in the top twelve week, "Yoü and I" by Lady Gaga in the top eleven week, "Fix You" by Coldplay in the top ten week, and "What the World Needs Now is Love" by Burt Bacharach in the semifinals week.  The latter two songs charted in the Top 10 of iTunes, giving Cartelli a download bonus multiplier for each performance.

During part one of the Live Finale on May 21, 2018, she joined her coach, Clarkson, in a coach duet as they sang "Don't Dream It's Over" by Crowded House.  She then performed the original song "Walk My Way" written by Julia Michaels, and she closed the night with "Skyfall" by Adele.  The following night, she and Michaels performed a duet of "Issues" and "Jump".  At the end of the night, Cartelli was named the winner of Season 14 of The Voice over Team Alicia member Britton Buchanan, becoming the youngest contestant to win The Voice. This also signified a win for Cartelli's coach, Clarkson, securing Clarkson's first win as a first-time coach, a feat that no other coach had accomplished until John Legend did so during season 16. (This isn't counting original coach Adam Levine's Season 1 win.) Cartelli received a prize of $100,000 and a record deal with Republic Records.

The Voice performances
 – Studio version of performance reached the top 10 on iTunes

After The Voice
After winning The Voice, Cartelli signed with Brandon Blackstock, Clarkson's then-husband and manager, and manager to Blake Shelton. Cartelli signed with Atlantic Records in December 2018.  Cartelli opened up for Clarkson on her Meaning of Life Tour, which began on January 24, 2019.

Cartelli has also returned to The Voice several times. The first visit was during the blind auditions of the fifteenth season, when she simply visited several of the artists hoping to audition for the show.  The second was during that season's finale, when she performed her new original single, "Last Night's Mascara".  The third was during the results show of the first week of the sixteenth season's Live Cross-Battles, when she performed another new original single of hers called "Grow Young".

In March 19, 2021, Cartelli released the single, "Long Way Home" (co-written with Nathan Chapman), and on April 30, 2021, she released her next single "If I Could" (written with Ben Abraham). The song has over 6 million streams on Spotify. With the release of the two singles she announced on Instagram her debut EP, Based on a True Story, which was released on May 28, 2021. It debuted at number nine on the iTunes Charts.

Discography

Singles

EPs

Awards and nominations

Tours
Supporting
Meaning of Life Tour (2019) (with Kelly Clarkson
Red Pill Blues Tour (2019) (with Maroon 5, one show)
Never Ending Summer Tour (2022) (with OneRepublic)

References

Sources

External links
Youngest-Ever ‘Voice’ Winner Brynn Cartelli on Her Big Victory - Interview at Rolling Stone

2003 births
21st-century American women singers
American women pop singers
American new wave musicians
Atlantic Records artists
Elektra Records artists
Living people
People from Longmeadow, Massachusetts
Republic Records artists
Singer-songwriters from Massachusetts
The Voice (franchise) winners
Universal Music Group artists
21st-century American singers
American women singer-songwriters